Darling Darling may refer to:

Darling Darling (1977 film), a Bollywood film
Darling Darling (2000 film), a Malayalam musical comedy
Darling Darling (2001 film), a Telugu musical comedy
Darling Darling (2005 film), a short film starring Michael Cera
"Darling Darling" (song), a 2001 single by Hitomi Yaida
"Darling Darling", a 2008 song by the Hellacopters from their album Head Off

See also
Darling (disambiguation)
Darling, Darling, Darling, a 1982 Tamil film
"Darling Darling Darling", a 1970 song by the Meters from their album Struttin'